Rostislav Sinicyn (also romanized as Sinitsyn; born 18 October 1955) is an ice dancer who competed for the Soviet Union. With his wife Natalia Karamyševa (Karamysheva), Sinicyn is the 1978 and 1980 Soviet national champion. Following his retirement from competitive skating, he works as a coach and choreographer and was naturalized as a Czech citizen.

Career 
Rostislav Sinitsyn and Natalia Karamysheva placed 5th at the 1979 European Championships and 7th at the 1980 World Championships. They won the silver medal at the 1981 Winter Universiade.

Following his retirement from competitive skating, Sinicyn became a coach and choreographer. His current and former students and clients include:

Ice dancing
Saskia Brall / Tim Giesen
Jana Čejková / Alexandr Sinicyn
Kamila Hájková / David Vincour
Carolina Hermann / Daniel Hermann
Barbora Heroldova / Zdenek Pazdera
Lucie Myslivečková / Matěj Novák
Karolína Procházková / Michal Češka, 
Margarita Drobiazko / Povilas Vanagas
Nelli Zhiganshina / Alexander Gazsi

Single skating
Radka Bártová
Nika Ceric
Annette Dytrt
Tatiana Malinina
Sara Falotico
Ivana Hudziecová
Olga Ikonnikova
Pavel Kaška
Denise Koegl
Damjan Ostojič
Teodora Poštič
Silvio Smalun
Tomáš Verner
Kristin Wieczorek
Aleksandr Selevko
Mihhail Selevko
Olga Mikutina

Personal life 
Sinicyn is a naturalized Czech citizen. He is married to Natalia Karamyševa. Their son, Alexandr Sinicyn (born 27 March 1996 in Prague), is a competitive ice dancer for the Czech Republic.

Sinicyn and Sinitsyn have both been used to romanize his surname. Sinicyn is the Czech-style version.

Results
(with Karamysheva)

References

Navigation 

1955 births
Living people
Soviet male ice dancers
Figure skating choreographers
Russian figure skating coaches
Czech figure skating coaches
Universiade medalists in figure skating
Russian emigrants to the Czech Republic
Czech people of Russian descent
People from Nizhny Tagil
Universiade silver medalists for the Soviet Union
Competitors at the 1981 Winter Universiade
Sportspeople from Sverdlovsk Oblast